Phyllonorycter takagii is a moth of the family Gracillariidae. It is known from the island of Honshū in Japan and from the Russian Far East.

The wingspan is 5.5–6 mm.

The larvae feed on Alnus japonica. They mine the leaves of their host plant. The mine has the form of a ptychonomous leaf mine, situated between two veins on the underside of the leaf.

References

takagii
Moths of Japan
Moths of Asia
Moths described in 1963